Gayle King (born December 28, 1954) is an American television personality, author and broadcast journalist for CBS News, co-hosting its flagship morning program, CBS Mornings, and before that its predecessor CBS This Morning. She is also an editor-at-large for O, The Oprah Magazine.

King was named one of Time magazine's "100 Most Influential People of 2019".

Early life
Gayle King's parents are Peggy and Scott King. King was born in Chevy Chase, Maryland, and from age six to eleven she lived in Ankara, Turkey, where her father was deployed. She returned with her family to the United States in 1966, where her father worked as an electrical engineer. King graduated from the University of Maryland, College Park, with a degree in psychology.

Career

Television broadcast news
King's career began as a production assistant at WJZ-TV in Baltimore, where she met Oprah Winfrey, an anchor for the station at the time. King later trained as a reporter at WUSA-TV in Washington, D.C. After working at WJZ, she moved to Kansas City, Missouri, where she was a weekend anchor and general-assignment reporter at WDAF-TV. In 1981, she was hired as a news anchor for WFSB in Hartford, Connecticut, where she worked for 18 years. Part of that time, she lived in Glastonbury, Connecticut.

Talk shows and morning news co-anchor
King worked as a special correspondent for The Oprah Winfrey Show. In 1991, King briefly co-hosted an NBC daytime talk show with Robin Wagner called Cover to Cover, which was canceled after 13 weeks. In 1997, she was offered her own syndicated talk show, The Gayle King Show, which was canceled after one season due to low ratings. In September 2006, King began to host The Gayle King Show on XM Satellite Radio.

On January 3, 2011, King began hosting a new show, also called The Gayle King Show, on OWN. The Gayle King Show ended on November 17, 2011, as a result of King going to CBS to co-anchor CBS This Morning alongside Charlie Rose and a series of third co-anchors including for a time Norah O'Donnell. The show succeeded in the ratings. King and Rose were noted as having good on-air chemistry. The two became friends as well, and remained friends even after Rose exited from CBS due to the  sexual misconduct allegations against him.

Print journalism
King joined O, The Oprah Magazine as an editor in 1999.

Network news

Before joining CBS News, King worked as a special correspondent for Good Morning America. On November 10, 2011, King secured a deal with CBS to co-anchor CBS This Morning, beginning on January 9, 2012. She publicly called for CBS to have full transparency when it was learned CBS planned on keeping the findings of sexual abuse and harassment at the network private.  She received recognition for remaining stoic during an interview with R. Kelly, who rose from his chair and began to scream and beat his chest in an interview discussing the sexual abuse allegations made against him.

In 2018, King was inducted into the Broadcasting & Cable Hall of Fame. She was also chosen as one of Time magazine's 100 most influential people of 2019.

In 2020, shortly after the death of Kobe Bryant, King received social media criticism for a CBS This Morning interview with former WNBA player Lisa Leslie, in which King brought up Bryant's sexual assault allegations from 2003. Rapper Snoop Dogg was among those who criticized King, though he later apologized. She received support, particularly from long-time friend Oprah Winfrey. King said CBS had used an out-of-context excerpt from the interview. The network said in a statement that the excerpt was not reflective of the "thoughtful, wide-ranging interview" King had conducted with Leslie.

In January 2022, King had extended her contract with CBS News to continue as co-anchor of CBS Mornings.

Personal life
King has been a close friend of Oprah Winfrey since 1976. In a 2010 interview with Barbara Walters, Winfrey said of King, "She is the mother I never had, she is the sister everybody would want, she is the friend everybody deserves, I don't know a better person".

From 1982 to 1993, King was married to Bill Bumpus, an attorney and an assistant attorney general in Connecticut. They share a daughter, Kirby, and a son, William Bumpus Jr.

Filmography

See also
 New Yorkers in journalism

References

External links

Oprah and Friends at XM Satellite Radio

1954 births
Living people
American magazine editors
American television hosts
American radio personalities
American women radio presenters
African-American radio personalities
African-American television hosts
African-American television personalities
American women television journalists
CBS News people
People from Chevy Chase, Maryland
University of Maryland, College Park alumni
20th-century American journalists
21st-century American journalists
Women magazine editors
American women television presenters
20th-century African-American women
20th-century African-American people
21st-century American women
21st-century African-American women
21st-century African-American people